1870s fashion in European and European-influenced clothing is characterized by a gradual return to a narrow silhouette after the full-skirted fashions of the 1850s and 1860s.

Women's fashions

Overview

By 1870, fullness in the skirt had moved to the rear, where elaborately draped overskirts were held in place by tapes and supported by a bustle.  This fashion required an underskirt, which was heavily trimmed with pleats, flounces, rouching, and frills.  This fashion was short-lived (though the bustle would return again in the mid-1880s), and was succeeded by a tight-fitting silhouette with fullness as low as the knees: the cuirass bodice, a form-fitting, long-waisted, boned bodice that reached below the hips, and the princess sheath dress. Sleeves were very tight fitting. Square necklines were common.

Day dresses had high necklines that were either closed, squared, or V-shaped.  Sleeves of morning dresses were narrow throughout the period, with a tendency to flare slightly at the wrist early on.  Women often draped overskirts to produce an apronlike effect from the front.

Gowns had low necklines and very short, off-the-shoulder sleeves, and were worn with short (later mid-length) gloves.  Other characteristic fashions included a velvet ribbon tied high around the neck and trailing behind for evening in a similar style to Georgian era fashion (the origin of the modern choker necklace).

Tea gowns and artistic dress

Under the influence of the Pre-Raphaelite Brotherhood and other artistic reformers, the "anti-fashion" for Artistic dress with its "medieval" details and uncorseted lines continued through the 1870s.  Newly fashionable tea gowns, an informal fashion for entertaining at home, combined Pre-Raphaelite influences with the loose sack-back styles of the 18th century.

Leisure Dress

Leisure dress was becoming an important part of a woman's wardrobe. Seaside dress  in England had its own distinct characteristics but still followed the regular fashions of the day. Seaside dress was seen as more daring, frivolous, eccentric, and brighter. Even though the bustle was extremely cumbersome, it was still a part of seaside fashion.

Undergarments
With the narrower silhouette, emphasis was placed on the bust, waist and hips. A corset was used to help mold the body to the desired shape. This was achieved by making the corsets longer than before, and by constructing them from separate shaped pieces of fabric. To improve support, corsets were reinforced with many strips of whalebone, cording, or pieces of leather. Steam-molding, patented in 1868, helped hold the curvaceous contour.

Skirts were supported by a hybrid of the bustle and crinoline or hooped petticoat sometimes called a "crinolette". The cage structure was attached around the waist and extended down to the ground, but only extended down the back of the wearer's legs. The crinolette itself was quickly superseded by the true bustle, which was sufficient for supporting the drapery and train at the back of the skirt.

Hairstyles and headgear

In keeping with the vertical emphasis, hair was pulled back at the sides and worn in a high knot or cluster of ringlets, often with a fringe (bangs) over the forehead.  False hair was commonly used.  Bonnets were smaller to allow for the elaborately piled hairstyles and resembled hats except for their ribbons tied under the chin.  Smallish hats, some with veils, were perched on top of the head, and brimmed straw hats were worn for outdoor wear in summer.

Wraps and Overcoats

The main kind of wrap that dominated in the 1870s were capes and jackets that had a back vent in order to make room for the bustle. Some examples are the pelisse and the paletot coat.

Style gallery 1870–1874

Walking dress of 1870 has a tiered and ruffled skirt back.
1870 fashion plate shows jacket-bodices with draped and trimmed skirts in back.  Ruffles and pleated frills are characteristic trimmings of the 1870s.
1870s American bathing dress, with ankle length skirt, long pants, and long sleeves
French morning dress of 1871 features a narrow red ribbon at the low neckline and a large matching bow with streamers at the back waist.
Dolly Varden dresses of 1872 demonstrate the popular fashion of the early 1870s known as "Dolly Varden"
Artistic dress of the early 1870s.  Portrait of Mrs. Frances Leyland by Whistler.
Day dress ca 1872-75s, purple silk
Outdoor dresses of 1874 feature overskirts caught up with buckled ribbons. Jacket-bodices have cuffs and high necklines.  Small straw hats with flat crowns and long ribbons (similar to men's boaters) are worn tipped forward.
Gala dress ca 1874. 
Backview of a dress of 1874 shows the draping of the overskirt and the slight train on the underskirt.  France.
Dress of 1874 with draped overskirt and ruffled underskirt.

Style gallery 1874–1879

Tight dresses with long trains of the mid-1870s are trimmed with pleated ruffles, bows, buttons, and braid, and are worn with hats with ribbon streamers.
French gown is festooned with flowers and is worn with mid-length white gloves and a black neck ribbon.  The high-knotted hairstyle is typical of the mid-1870s.
Morning dress of c. 1875 has a trailing overskirt and is trimmed with a profusion of ruffles and ribbons.  Hair is braided into a crown high on the head.
 Princesses Dagmar and Alexandra of Denmark in 1875.
Semi-sheer dresses of c. 1877 show back fullness beginning at hip-level rather than the waist as in 1874–5.  The tight, princess-line dress on the right fits smoothly to the body from the shoulders to the lower hips.
Gown of 1878 has a long train and a squared neckline.  It is worn with opera-length gloves.
Jacket and skirt costume of 1878 features a long train trimmed with pleated frills and ruching.  Matching ruching trims the cuffs of the sleeves.
Court gown of 1876 features a train, long white gloves and the three white ostrich feathers representing the Prince of Wales plumes in the hair.
Hunting costume  is made green wool, Scotland, c. 1878.

Caricature gallery

Cartoon "Veto" by George du Maurier from Punch, satirizing the tight dress styles of the late 1870s.
An extreme class contrast: "Young lady of fashion, 1871" vs. "London Dairywoman".
From the Danish Punch, satirizing the general fashion in 1876
Cartoon by George du Maurier from Punch, May 25, 1878, satirizing both impractical women's fashions and men's formal military uniforms.

Men's fashion

Innovations in men's fashion of the 1870s included the acceptance of patterned or figured fabrics for shirts and the general replacement of neckties tied in bow knots with the four-in-hand and later the ascot tie.

Coats and trousers
Frock coats remained fashionable, but new shorter versions arose, distinguished from the sack coat  by a waist seam. Waistcoats  (U.S. vests) were generally cut straight across the front and had collars and lapels, but collarless waistcoats were also worn.

Three-piece suits consisting of a high-buttoned sack coat with matching waistcoat and trousers, called ditto suits or (UK) lounge suits, grew in popularity; the sack coat might be cutaway so that only the top button could be fastened.

The cutaway morning coat was still worn for informal day occasions in Europe and major cities elsewhere.  Frock coats were required for more formal daytime dress. Formal evening dress remained a dark tail coat and trousers.  The coat now fastened lower on the chest and had wider lapels. A new fashion was a dark rather than white waistcoat.  Evening wear was worn with a white bow tie and a shirt with the new winged collar.

Topcoats had wide lapels and deep cuffs, and often featured contrasting velvet collars.  Furlined full-length overcoats were luxury items in the coldest climates.

Full-length trousers were worn for most occasions; tweed or woollen breeches were worn for hunting and hiking.

In 1873, Levi Strauss and Jacob Davis began to sell the original copper-riveted blue jeans in San Francisco. These became popular with the local multitude of gold seekers, who wanted strong clothing with durable pockets.

Shirts and neckties
The points of high upstanding shirt collars were increasingly pressed into "wings".

Necktie fashions included the four-in-hand and, toward the end of the decade, the ascot tie, a tie with wide wings and a narrow neckband, fastened with a jewel or stickpin.  Ties knotted in a bow remained a conservative fashion, and a white bowtie was required with formal evening wear.

A narrow ribbon tie was an alternative for tropical climates, and was increasingly worn elsewhere, especially in the Americas.

Accessories
Top hats remained a requirement for upper class formal wear; bowlers and soft felt hats in a variety of shapes were worn for more casual occasions, and flat straw boaters were worn for yachting and other nautical pastimes.

Style gallery 1870–1875

1870s photo of President Rutherford B. Hayes.  His coat and shawl-collared vest or waistcoat have covered buttons.  Note functional buttonholes all the way up his coat lapel.
Three-piece suit with frock coat, 1870s.
Oliver Hazard Perry Morton wears a narrow string tie, 1870s.
Gentleman in a railway carriage wears a dust-colored coat, trousers, and collar-less waistcoat with a dark red necktie.  He wears a fur-lined overcoat and tan gloves.  Britain, 1872.
Plate from The Gazette of Fashion shows a fur-lined overcoat (left) and double-breasted topcoat (right) with braid trim and decorative topstitching, 1872.  Checked trousers were quite fashionable.
Photographer Mathew Brady wears a coat with braid trim on the collar and lapels over a matching waistcoat.  His turned-down collar is worn over a four-in-hand necktie. 1875.

Style gallery 1875–1879

Two-piece lounge suit of tartan wool twill buttons high in front. English lounge suits were typically worn with bowler hats. 1875-80, England, Los Angeles County Museum of Art, M.2010.33.9a-b.
Major-General The Hon. James MacDonald is drawn by James Tissot in a slightly fitted, double-breasted topcoat with a diagonally positioned breast pocket and a contrasting collar.  His shirt collar is pressed into flat wings and is worn with a wide, dark tie.  He wears a top hat and gloves.  1876.
1879 photo of American lawman Bat Masterson wearing a three-piece suit and a bowler hat.  His cutaway sack coat has a high front closure and is worn buttoned only at the top, over a vest or waistcoat cut straight across at the waist and decorated with a prominent watch chain.
Vanity Fair sketch of 1879 shows Sir Albert Abdallah David Sassoon in "morning dress" (formal daywear): grey trousers, dark cutaway coat, white waistcoat, wing-collared shirt and dark tie.
British statesman William Gladstone wears conservative clothing;  his tall collar is still upstanding, and he wears his tie in a bow knot. 1879.

Necktie gallery

1873 portraits of members of the Legislative Assembly of Ontario illustrate the variety of fashionable neckwear (and facial hair).

Children's fashion
Infants continued to be dressed in flowing gowns, a style that continued into the early 20th century.  Gender dress changes often did not occur until a child was five or six; however, in the later decades gender dress came much sooner. Girls' ages could be depicted often based on the length of their skirt. As the girls got older, they wore longer skirts. A four-year-old would wear her skirt slightly above knee length; ten to twelve at mid-knee; twelve to fifteen varied from below the knee to mid-calf; and by sixteen or seventeen, a girl's dress would be just above ankle length. The age of a boy could often be decided based on the length and type of trouser or how similar the attire was to that of a man's. Boys often dressed similar to adult males, as they too wore blazers and Norfolk jackets.

Much influence on the styles of children's dress came from artist Kate Greenaway, an illustrator of children's books. She strongly influenced styles of young girls' dress, as she often showed girls dressed in empire styles in her books. The idea of children's dress being taken from books is also found is styles such as the Little Lord Fauntleroy suit which was worn by the hero of a children's book published in 1885-86.

See also
Victorian fashion
Corset controversy
Dolly Varden (costume)
Artistic Dress movement

Notes

References
Arnold, Janet: Patterns of Fashion 2: Englishwomen's Dresses and Their Construction C.1860–1940, Wace 1966, Macmillan 1972. Revised metric edition, Drama Books 1977. 
Ashelford, Jane: The Art of Dress: Clothing and Society 1500–1914, Abrams, 1996. 
 Goldthorpe, Caroline: From Queen to Empress: Victorian Dress 1837–1877, Metropolitan Museum of Art, New York, 1988,  (full text available online from the Metropolitan Museum of Art Digital Collections)
Martin, Linda: "The Way We Wore, Fashion Illustrations of Children's Wear 1870- 1970", Charles Scribner's Sons, New York, 1978, 
Payne, Blanche: History of Costume from the Ancient Egyptians to the Twentieth Century, Harper & Row, 1965. No ISBN for this edition; ASIN B0006BMNFS
Steele, Valerie: Paris Fashion: A Cultural History, Oxford University Press, 1988; 
Takeda, Sharon Sadako, and Kaye Durland Spilker, Fashioning Fashion: European Dress in Detail, 1700 - 1915, LACMA/Prestel USA (2010), 
Tortora, Phyllis. Eubank, Keith: "Survey of Historic Costume, A History of Western Dress", Fourth Edition.  Fairchild Publications, Inc. 1989;

External links
1870s Fashion Plates of men, women, and children's fashion from The Metropolitan Museum of Art Libraries
History of 1870s bustles 
Victorian Women's fashion: 1870s
Victorian Women's Fashion, 1850-1900: Hairstyles
1870s Men's Fashions – c. 1870 Men's Fashion Photos with Annotations
From Reforming Fashion, 1850-1914: Politics, Health, and Art, Ohio State University :
Reda silk brocade tea gown, c. 1876
Brown challis tean gown in Liberty of London fabric, c. 1877
 
Woman’s dress, 1870s, in the Staten Island Historical Society Online Collections Database
Girl’s dress, 1870s, in the Staten Island Historical Society Online Collections Database

1870s fashion
History of clothing (Western fashion)